David Jacobs (born August 12, 1939) is an American television writer, producer and director. He is most well known as the creator of the CBS primetime series Dallas, Knots Landing, and Paradise.

Life and career
David Jacobs was born in Baltimore, Maryland, the elder of two children (with a younger sister). His Jewish parents were of modest means, and Jacobs's father worked as a household appliance salesman. Jacobs was educated at Baltimore City College High School, and received a BFA from the Maryland Institute College of Art. Soon after graduation, he moved to New York City, where he worked as an illustrator and researcher for Grolier's Encyclopedia. He soon branched out as a freelance writer of nonfiction articles, the best known of which concerned the architect and inventor Buckminster Fuller. He also wrote a children's book on the great artists of the Renaissance.. In 1975 he co-wrote  the non-fiction book "Police, a Precinct at Work", with Sara Ann Friedman. The book was a series of stories based upon 6 months of the authors' ride-alongs with police from NYPD's 24th precinct.

His marriage to actress Lynn Pleshette produced one child, his daughter Albyn, but ended in divorce. Later, he married his current wife Diana, with whom he has two children, Aaron and Molly. Jacobs moved to Los Angeles to be closer to his daughter, and tried his hand at screenwriting. His script for a proposed unnamed pilot mini series was later named Dallas.  The mini series was so successful that the show was picked up as an on-going series & cemented his career as a writer and producer.

Filmography

References

External links
 
 
 David Jacobs at Columbia College Hollywood

1939 births
Living people
American soap opera writers
American male television writers
American television producers
Jewish American writers
Showrunners
Writers from Baltimore
Maryland Institute College of Art alumni
Screenwriters from Maryland
21st-century American Jews